This is a list of National Hockey League (NHL) players who have played at least one game in the NHL from 1917 to present and have a last name that starts with "X", "Y" or "Z."

List updated as of the 2018–19 NHL season.

X 

 Arber Xhekaj

Y 

 Jeremy Yablonski
 Vitali Yachmenev
 Ken Yackel
 Terry Yake
 Bogdan Yakimov
 Egor Yakovlev
 Mikhail Yakubov
 Nail Yakupov
 Dmitriy Yakushin
 Kailer Yamamoto
 Keith Yandle
 Gary Yaremchuk
 Ken Yaremchuk
 Alexei Yashin
 Ross Yates
 Trent Yawney
 Alexei Yegorov
 Alexander Yelesin
 Stephane Yelle
 Vitali Yeremeyev
 Brandon Yip
 Juha Ylonen
 Nolan Yonkman
 Harry York
 Jason York
 Mike York
 B. J. Young
 Brian Young
 Bryan Young
 C. J. Young
 Doug Young
 Howie Young
 Scott Young
 Tim Young
 Warren Young
 Wendell Young
 Tom Younghans
 Paul Ysebaert
 Danil Yurtaykin
 Dmitri Yushkevich
 Steve Yzerman

Z 

 Matt Zaba
 Libor Zabransky
 Pavel Zacha
 Filip Zadina
 Nikita Zadorov
 Artyom Zagidulin
 Miles Zaharko
 Rod Zaine
 Nikita Zaitsev
 Travis Zajac
 Zarley Zalapski
 Miroslav Zalesak
 Steven Zalewski
 Rob Zamuner
 Mike Zanier
 Greg Zanon
 Joe Zanussi
 Ron Zanussi
 Jeff Zatkoff
 Brad Zavisha
 Jakub Zboril
 Richard Zednik
 Trevor Zegras
 Jeff Zehr
 Larry Zeidel
 John Zeiler
 Valeri Zelepukin
 Richard Zemlak
 Ed Zeniuk
 Jason Zent
 Rob Zepp
 Henrik Zetterberg
 Lars Zetterstrom
 Rob Zettler
 Peter Zezel
 Alexei Zhamnov
 Vladimir Zharkov
 Nikolay Zherdev
 Alexei Zhitnik
 Sergei Zholtok
 Mika Zibanejad
 Marek Zidlicky
 Thomas Ziegler
 Mike Zigomanis
 Dwayne Zinger
 Sergei Zinovjev
 Tomas Zizka
 Doug Zmolek
 Martin Zoborosky
 Radim Zohorna
 Harry Zolnierczyk
 Rick Zombo
 Artyom Zub
 Ilya Zubov
 Sergei Zubov
 Dainius Zubrus
 Mats Zuccarello
 Jason Zucker
 Mike Zuke
 Rudy Zunich
 Valentin Zykov
 Andrei Zyuzin

See also
hockeydb.com NHL Player List - Y
hockeydb.com NHL Player List - Z

Notes

Players